.hm is the Internet country code top-level domain (ccTLD) of the Heard and McDonald Islands, uninhabited islands in the southern Indian Ocean under the sovereign control of Australia. Although .hm gets a small amount of use, Australia uses the .aq domain (for Antarctica) for its sites related to the islands themselves. As a result, no .hm website is related to the location.

History 
The .hm registry was added in July 1997 by Edward Sweeney, who made its registration system accessible on registry.hm. By 2019, the .hm TLD had stopped working, and .hm websites started to go dark. Journalists looking into the matter said acquaintances in the industry had not seen Edward Sweeney, who was still in charge of the .hm registry, since 2000. He later resurfaced, claiming he was still managing the registry, and had run into technical issues.

Domain registration is directly at the second level, and is managed by the HM Domain Registry. Any entity can register an .hm domain.

References

External links
IANA .hm whois information
.hm domain registration website
Official Australia government site about Heard & Mcdonald Islands, heardisland.aq

Country code top-level domains
Computer-related introductions in 1997

sv:Toppdomän#H